John Wilson (born 1830, year of death unknown) was a politician in Scotland.  He was member of parliament (MP) for Edinburgh Central from 1885 to 1886, having been elected as an "Independent Liberal".

He lost his seat in 1886, standing as a Liberal Unionist.

References

External links 
 

1830 births
UK MPs 1885–1886
Year of death unknown
Members of the Parliament of the United Kingdom for Edinburgh constituencies
Liberal Unionist Party MPs for Scottish constituencies
Scottish Liberal Party MPs